The following table details the appearances by clubs in the regular rounds (round of 32 onwards) of the Australian Australia Cup association football competition. The competition was known as the FFA Cup until the name was changed in February 2022.

The 32 teams that make up the Australia Cup competition proper are 10 A-League Men teams with the remaining 22 teams composed of various semi-professional and amateur qualifiers, referred to as "Member Federation Clubs", from each of the state federations. Up to and including the 2019 edition, the top level A-League Men clubs automatically qualified for the round of 32, while the "Member Federation Clubs" from lower levels have to qualify through preliminary rounds, or (since 2015) via winning the National Premier Leagues final.

For the 2020 FFA Cup the preliminary competition was suspended in mid-March due to the COVID-19 pandemic in Australia, and subsequently cancelled in July.

Following expansion of the A-League Men, from the 2021 edition, the bottom four teams of the A-League Men season played-off for two spots to maintain the total number of A-League Men teams at 10 for the Round of 32.

Appearances 

 

Final position count of clubs are updated only for clubs eliminated from the competition (so does not include clubs still active in the current competition).

Clubs still active in the current season are bolded.

See also
List of Australian Cup Winners

External links
 Official website

Notes

References

Australia Cup